Hugues Jean Marie Auffray (born 18 August 1929), better known as Hugues Aufray, is a French singer-songwriter and guitarist.

Aufray is known for French language covers of Bob Dylan's songs. Aufray knew Dylan and his work from his time in New York City, as well as from record shops, and his translations capture the rawness of the original songs.

His most famous original songs are "Santiano", "Céline", "Stewball" and "Hasta Luego".

Early life
He was born to Henry Auffray, an industrialist and Amyelle de Caubios d'Andiran, (1898-1992) a musician, second cousin of the French author François Mauriac (respectively by their maternal grandfather and maternal grandmother).
His sister was actress Pascale Audret (1936–2000) and his niece is actress Julie Dreyfus.

Once Aufray's parents divorced, the family left Paris for Sorèze (Tarn - Occitania), where he was raised by his mother. During the war, he studied at Sorèze secondary school.

In 1945, Aufray joined his father in Madrid, living there for three years. He attended the Lycée Français de Madrid in Madrid, and graduated with his baccalauréat. He then returned to France to start singing in Spanish.

Musical career

He first began writing songs for French singers. After finishing second in a singing competition, he signed a record deal in 1959 with Eddie Barclay.

From there, he went on to co-write and arrange many songs, drawing influence from folk, blues and rock. While supporting Peter, Paul and Mary in New York in 1962, he struck up a friendship with Bob Dylan, who would then visit him in Paris in 1964. Aufray translated many of Dylan's songs into French: their appearance on his 1965 album Aufray chante Dylan helped form the tastes of the new French generation.

Aufray represented Luxembourg in the 1964 Eurovision Song Contest, performing "Dès que le printemps revient" and finishing fourth.

In 1966, he sang Les Crayons de Couleur in support of Martin Luther King Jr. at an anti-racism benefit.

In 1984, he sang a duet with Bob Dylan at a concert in Grenoble, and performed with him in Paris as well.

In 2022, he received a special prize celebrating his whole musical career, during the 63rd International Congress of the Société des Poètes et Artistes de France (Spaf), which was organized that year in Sorèze.

Discography

Main EPs and singles 
 Le poinçonneur des Lilas; Mes petites odalisques / Y'avait Fanny (Qui chantait); Nous avions vingt ans (1959)
 La complainte de Mackie; Le jugement dernier / La flotte américaine; Nuit d'hiver (1959)
 Nuit et jour (Liebelei); Trois hommes / San Miguel; Madeleine (1961)
 Tucumcari; Ses baisers me grisaient / La femme du Liberia; Monsieur le soleil (1961)
 Santiano; Notre rivière / Georgia; Mille rayons (1961)
 J'entends siffler le train; Les deux frères / Loin de toi; L'enfant do (1962)
 Je reviens (Les portes de Saint-Malo); Là-haut / C'est pas la peine; Oui tu verras (1963)
 Tout le long du chemin (Singing the Blues); 4 vents (Four Stong Winds) / N'y pense plus (Don't Think Twice, It's All Right); Allez allez mon troupeau (Ally, Ally Exen Free) (1964)
 À bientôt nous deux; Le bonheur n'est-il pas fait pour moi ? / Guidez mes pas; Dès que le printemps revient (1964)
 Debout les gars; Nous avions beaucoup dansé / Pends-moi; Ja-da (1964)
 Le rossignol anglais; Personne ne sait / Le coeur gros; Tu sens bon la terre (1965)
 Dou-wakadou; On est les rois (King of the Road) / Les remords et les regrets; Bambou (1965)
 L'homme-orchestre; Je croyais / Laisse-moi petite fille; Les yeux fermés (1965)
 L'épervier / Le joueur de pipeau (1966)
 Les crayons de couleur / Les tourterelles (1966)
 Céline; Les mercenaires / Stewball; Le bon Dieu s'ennuyait (1966)
 De velours noir; C'est tout bon / Petit frère; Près du coeur les blessures (1967)
 Je n'en reviens pas; Chloé / Voilà mes conditions; Vidita (1967)
 Des jonquilles aux derniers lilas; L'infidèle / Le château du hibou; Au clocher de Rouen (1968)
 La nuit est belle; Le port de Tacoma / Le petit âne gris; Chanson de la mariée (1968)
 Un mur, un ruisseau, un jardin et des fleurs; Un marin c'est bien / Je ne suis plus maître chez moi; Pauvre Benoît (1969)
 Vous ma lady / Adieu (1972)
 Ton premier chagrin d'amour / Jolie Fanny (1974)
 Cauchemar locomoteur / Le moral à zéro (1975)
 C'est plus fort que moi, j'y crois (part 1) / C'est plus fort que moi, j'y crois (part 2) (1976)
 Dernières vacances / Ballade entre chien et loup (1977)
 Émilie Émilia / Loin vers Mexico (1979)
 Bye bye Moorea Tahiti / Ma soeur la pauvresse (1983)
 Dieu que c'est dur d'être modeste / Y'a toujours un train (1984)
 Petit homme / L'enfant sauvage (1984)

LPs and CDs

DVDs 
 Au Casino de Paris (1977)
 Route 91, Olympia (1991)
 Hugues Aufray, plus live que jamais ! (2005)

References

External links

Official site (in French)
 Biography of Hugues Aufray, from Radio France Internationale (in English)
 Ancestry of Hugues Aufray

1929 births
Living people
People from Neuilly-sur-Seine
Eurovision Song Contest entrants for Luxembourg
Eurovision Song Contest entrants of 1964
Commandeurs of the Ordre des Arts et des Lettres
Chevaliers of the Légion d'honneur
French male singers
French pop singers
French male songwriters